Mani Malai is a 1941 Indian Tamil-language anthology film. It consists of four short comedy films — Ashaadabuthi, Minor-in Kaathal, Abbuthi Adigal and Naveena Markandeyar — each made by a different director and featuring a different cast. The anthology film was successful.

Cast 

Ashaadabuthi
 P. B. Rangachari as the bhagavathar
 Jaya as the domestic help
 K. S. Adhilakshmi as the bhagavathars wife
 T. V. Sethuraman as the bhagavathars disciple
 M. R. Subramaniam as the village headman

Minor-in Kaathal
 T. S. Durairaj as the "minor"
 K. S. Adhilakshmi as the washerwoman
 M. R. Swaminathan as the washerwoman's husband

Abbuthi Adigal
 P. B. Rangachari as Adigal
 T. N. Meenakshi as Adigal's wife
 V. N. Sundaram as the saint/poet
 V. N. Janaki as a dancer
 Krishna Bai as a dancer

Naveena Markandeyar
 Kali N. Rathnam as Yama
 T. R. Ramachandran as Markandeya
 K. Hiranaiah is Chitragupta

Production 
Mani Malai is an anthology film consisting of four short comedy films, each made by a different director. The first, Ashaadabuthi, explores the serious issue of untouchability in a light manner, and was directed by Fram Sethna. The second, Minor-in Kaathal, revolves around a "minor" refusing to marry the woman of his mother's choice. The third, Abbuthi Adigal, is a story of "godly devotion dealt with humour". The fourth, Naveena Markandeyar, tells the story of Markandeya in a parodical manner and was directed by A. T. Krishnaswamy. Shooting for Mani Malai took place at Vel Pictures Studio, Guindy.

Release and reception 
Mani Malai was released in 1941 and emerged a commercial success; according to Krishnaswamy, it was due to "the presence of top comedy actors of that era". The Indian Express wrote, "Usual slap-stick inescapably lapsing into cheap humourising of domestic life is provided."

Notes

References

External links 
 

1941 comedy films
1940s Tamil-language films
1941 films
Indian anthology films
Indian comedy films